Mojżesz Presburger, or Prezburger, (December 27, 1904 –  1943) was a Polish Jewish mathematician, logician, and philosopher. He was a student of Alfred Tarski, Jan Łukasiewicz, Kazimierz Ajdukiewicz, and Kazimierz Kuratowski. He is known for, among other things, having invented Presburger arithmetic as a student in 1929 – a form of arithmetic in which one allows induction but removes multiplication, to obtain a decidable theory.

He was born in Warsaw on December 27, 1904 to Abram Chaim Prezburger and Joehwet Prezburger (née Aszenmil). On October 7, 1930, he was awarded master in mathematics from Warsaw University. He died in the Holocaust, probably 1943.

In 2010, the European Association for Theoretical Computer Science began conferring the annual Presburger Award named after him to a young scientist (in exceptional cases to several young scientists) for outstanding contributions in theoretical computer science.  Mikołaj Bojańczyk was the first recipient.

References

External links
Mojżesz Presburger's Photograph and document of death
Documents about Presburger and a Flash presentation by Mikołaj Bojańczyk
Panel of the 1929 conference where Presburger presented his arithmetic
Presburger award, European Association for Theoretical Computer Science.

1904 births
1943 deaths
20th-century Polish mathematicians
20th-century Polish philosophers
Jewish philosophers
Polish Jews who died in the Holocaust
Polish logicians